The Cockeyed Cowboys of Calico County is a 1970 American comedy Western film by Universal Studios, directed by Anton Leader and Ranald MacDougall, and starring Dan Blocker and Nanette Fabray, with a supporting cast featuring Jim Backus, Mickey Rooney, Wally Cox, Jack Elam, Noah Beery, Jr. and Don "Red" Barry. MacDougal wrote the screenplay. It was originally made as a television film but the decision was made to release it to movie theaters.

The film became Blocker's final role (besides his long-running role as "Hoss Cartwright" on Bonanza) before his death from complications from gall bladder surgery in May 1972. In late 2010, the Encore Westerns channel began showing this film intermittently on their schedule.

Synopsis
Shy naive Charley Bicker, the only blacksmith within 100 miles, begins corresponding with a potential mail-order bride named Ellen, and sends her all his savings for a train ticket to the town of Calico. He kept his marriage plans secret from everyone except the storekeeper who sent off for a wedding ring, but the storekeeper told everyone else, so a crowd shows up at the train station when Charley goes there to meet his bride. The lady isn’t on the train and Charley is humiliated, so pretends it was all a joke.

Meanwhile a nearly-blind bounty hunter named Kittrick comes to town and tries to find his way to the sheriff’s office.

Charley believes he is the laughing-stock of the town, and starts packing up to start a new life elsewhere. The townsfolk are in a panic, for they need their blacksmith. Mr. Bester, who owns a freight hauling business, has all his wagons at the blacksmith shop for repairs, and if they aren’t repaired no businesses can get new supplies. It is decided to say Charley’s mail-order bride got off at the wrong town, and will be arriving on the stagecoach. They will need to find someone to pretend to be the lady Charley was corresponding with, who will agree to be courted for a few days, and then politely say she changed her mind about marriage.

The only single woman in town is saloon girl Sadie, who is seeing Roger Hand – a man who is jealous of anyone who pays attention to Sadie. Charley doesn’t drink much, so he’s never seen the saloon girl. At first Sadie refuses to go along with the scheme, but then thinks of how the respectable ladies show disapproval whenever they see her, so she'll pretend to be someone the ladies will treat as an equal.

Charley and Sadie meet, and she is charmed by how kind and gentle he is, and how well he treats her. Mrs. Bester says Sadie (pretending to be Ellen) will be staying at the Bester house. Charley tells Sadie he’s fixed up a house for them to live in, if she’ll consent to marrying him. They make plans to visit the house the next day. That evening Mrs. Bester hears Sadie crying in the guest room and goes to talk to her. Mrs. Bester tells her she and all the other ladies knows who she really is, but they want her to marry Charley, so their husbands won’t be going to the saloon to see her sing and dance.

Roger Hand goes to visit Sadie at the saloon, and when he learns she is being courted by Charley he vows to get revenge on the blacksmith. The saloon patrons pull guns on him and tell him to leave town. Rogers says he’ll leave with Sadie.

Charley and Sadie visit the house he owns. She says she loves the house, and he is a good man, but she can’t marry him because she has not been a good woman.

The sheriff learns near-sighted Kittrick is in town to capture the outlaw Panama Jack. The sheriff draws on a wanted poster picture to make Panama Jack look like Roger Hand, and everyone at the saloon calls Roger by the outlaw’s name. Kittrick starts shooting at Roger, who jumps on a horse and rushes out of town, with Kittrick right behind him.

Sadie returns to the saloon and, while wearing a revealing costume, begins singing a song about not caring. Charley goes to the Bester house and asks Mrs. Bester to give Sadie the key to the house he fixed up, since he won’t be needing it. Mrs. Bester tells him how much Sadie cares for him. Charley goes to the saloon and tells Sadie they are getting married that very day.

Cast
	Dan Blocker - Charley Bicker 
	Nanette Fabray - Sadie 
	Jack Elam - Kittrick 
	Jim Backus - Sheriff Staunch 
	Wally Cox - Mr Bester 
	Mickey Rooney - Indian Tom
	Don "Red" Barry - Rusty
	Hamilton Camp - Mr Fowler
	James McCallion - Dr. Henry
	Noah Beery Jr. - Eddie
	Henry Jones - Hanson
	Marge Champion - Mrs Bester
	Jack Cassidy - Roger Hand
	Stubby Kaye - Bartender
	Byron Foulger - Rev Marshal
	Iron Eyes Cody - Crazy Foot
	Ray Ballard - Carson
	Susan Saint James - Martha Kidd
	Raven Grey - Eagle
	Michael-James Wixted - Boy at train station

References

External links

1970 films
1970 comedy films
1970s Western (genre) comedy films
American Western (genre) comedy films
1970s English-language films
Films directed by Ranald MacDougall
Films scored by Lyn Murray
Films with screenplays by Ranald MacDougall
Universal Pictures films
1970s American films